The 1976–77 Pittsburgh Penguins season was their tenth in the National Hockey League. They finished third in the Norris Division for the third season in a row. In the playoffs, the Penguins were eliminated in the first round. Changes occurred in management and ownership. In December 1976, Baz Bastien replaced Wren Blair as the club's general manager. The club was sold to shopping mall magnate Edward J. DeBartolo, Sr. in February 1977.

Regular season
Despite the fact that Pierre Larouche, Jean Pronovost and Syl Apps were unable to reproduce their franchise record-setting offensive output of the previous season the team finished with a similar regular season record on the strength of improved defensive prowess and the goaltending of Dunc Wilson and Denis Herron, who was re-acquired from the Kansas City Scouts in the off-season.

General Manager Wren Blair, who had been part of the ownership group which bought the club from the NHL in July 1975 until February 1976, was removed from his position December 3, 1976. Aldege 'Baz' Bastien, the man who had coached the American Hockey League's Pittsburgh Hornets to a Calder Cup championship in 1967, was named Blair's replacement.

Co-owners Al Savill and Otto Frenzel sold the club to shopping mall magnate Edward J. DeBartolo, Sr. in February 1977, less than two years after having bought the team from the NHL.

Final standings

Schedule and results

|- style="background:#cfc;"
| 1 || Oct 6 || Vancouver Canucks || 5–9 || Pittsburgh Penguins || Civic Arena || 1–0–0 || 2
|- style="background:#fcf;"
| 2 || Oct 7 || Pittsburgh Penguins || 1–10 || Montreal Canadiens || Montreal Forum || 1–1–0 || 2
|- style="background:#fcf;"
| 3 || Oct 9 || Los Angeles Kings || 7–4 || Pittsburgh Penguins || Civic Arena || 1–2–0 || 2
|- style="background:#fcf;"
| 4 || Oct 13 || Pittsburgh Penguins || 1–4 || Chicago Black Hawks || Chicago Stadium || 1–3–0 || 2
|- style="background:#fcf;"
| 5 || Oct 15 || Pittsburgh Penguins || 1–2 || Atlanta Flames || Omni Coliseum || 1–4–0 || 2
|- style="background:#cfc;"
| 6 || Oct 16 || Detroit Red Wings || 3–4 || Pittsburgh Penguins || Civic Arena || 2–4–0 || 4
|- style="background:#ffc;"
| 7 || Oct 20 || Pittsburgh Penguins || 4–4 || Toronto Maple Leafs || Maple Leaf Gardens || 2–4–1 || 5
|- style="background:#fcf;"
| 8 || Oct 23 || Montreal Canadiens || 9–1 || Pittsburgh Penguins || Civic Arena || 2–5–1 || 5
|- style="background:#ffc;"
| 9 || Oct 24 || Atlanta Flames || 3–3 || Pittsburgh Penguins || Civic Arena || 2–5–2 || 6
|- style="background:#ffc;"
| 10 || Oct 27 || Pittsburgh Penguins || 4–4 || Buffalo Sabres || Buffalo Memorial Auditorium || 2–5–3 || 7
|- style="background:#fcf;"
| 11 || Oct 28 || Pittsburgh Penguins || 0–3 || Philadelphia Flyers || The Spectrum || 2–6–3 || 7
|- style="background:#ffc;"
| 12 || Oct 30 || New York Rangers || 2–2 || Pittsburgh Penguins || Civic Arena || 2–6–4 || 8
|-

|- style="background:#cfc;"
| 13 || Nov 2 || Los Angeles Kings || 1–7 || Pittsburgh Penguins || Civic Arena || 3–6–4 || 10
|- style="background:#cfc;"
| 14 || Nov 5 || Pittsburgh Penguins || 4–1 || Colorado Rockies || McNichols Sports Arena || 4–6–4 || 12
|- style="background:#ffc;"
| 15 || Nov 7 || Pittsburgh Penguins || 2–2 || Cleveland Barons || Coliseum at Richfield || 4–6–5 || 13
|- style="background:#fcf;"
| 16 || Nov 10 || Pittsburgh Penguins || 2–3 || Minnesota North Stars || Met Center || 4–7–5 || 13
|- style="background:#cfc;"
| 17 || Nov 13 || Philadelphia Flyers || 0–1 || Pittsburgh Penguins || Civic Arena || 5–7–5 || 15
|- style="background:#cfc;"
| 18 || Nov 14 || Pittsburgh Penguins || 5–1 || New York Rangers || Madison Square Garden (IV) || 6–7–5 || 17
|- style="background:#fcf;"
| 19 || Nov 20 || Colorado Rockies || 5–2 || Pittsburgh Penguins || Civic Arena || 6–8–5 || 17
|- style="background:#cfc;"
| 20 || Nov 21 || Chicago Black Hawks || 0–5 || Pittsburgh Penguins || Civic Arena || 7–8–5 || 19
|- style="background:#fcf;"
| 21 || Nov 24 || Boston Bruins || 4–0 || Pittsburgh Penguins || Civic Arena || 7–9–5 || 19
|- style="background:#cfc;"
| 22 || Nov 26 || Pittsburgh Penguins || 3–1 || Cleveland Barons || Coliseum at Richfield || 8–9–5 || 21
|- style="background:#fcf;"
| 23 || Nov 27 || New York Islanders || 3–1 || Pittsburgh Penguins || Civic Arena || 8–10–5 || 21
|- style="background:#fcf;"
| 24 || Nov 30 || Pittsburgh Penguins || 4–6 || Washington Capitals || Capital Centre || 8–11–5 || 21
|-

|- style="background:#cfc;"
| 25 || Dec 2 || Pittsburgh Penguins || 4–2 || New York Islanders || Nassau Veterans Memorial Coliseum || 9–11–5 || 23
|- style="background:#fcf;"
| 26 || Dec 4 || Pittsburgh Penguins || 1–3 || Montreal Canadiens || Montreal Forum || 9–12–5 || 23
|- style="background:#cfc;"
| 27 || Dec 7 || Minnesota North Stars || 2–6 || Pittsburgh Penguins || Civic Arena || 10–12–5 || 25
|- style="background:#cfc;"
| 28 || Dec 9 || Pittsburgh Penguins || 2–1 || Buffalo Sabres || Buffalo Memorial Auditorium || 11–12–5 || 27
|- style="background:#fcf;"
| 29 || Dec 11 || Pittsburgh Penguins || 3–6 || New York Islanders || Nassau Veterans Memorial Coliseum || 11–13–5 || 27
|- style="background:#cfc;"
| 30 || Dec 12 || St. Louis Blues || 3–5 || Pittsburgh Penguins || Civic Arena || 12–13–5 || 29
|- style="background:#cfc;"
| 31 || Dec 16 || Cleveland Barons || 4–5 || Pittsburgh Penguins || Civic Arena || 13–13–5 || 31
|- style="background:#fcf;"
| 32 || Dec 18 || Washington Capitals || 5–3 || Pittsburgh Penguins || Civic Arena || 13–14–5 || 31
|- style="background:#fcf;"
| 33 || Dec 19 || Pittsburgh Penguins || 3–6 || Boston Bruins || Boston Garden || 13–15–5 || 31
|- style="background:#cfc;"
| 34 || Dec 22 || Pittsburgh Penguins || 5–2 || Toronto Maple Leafs || Maple Leaf Gardens || 14–15–5 || 33
|- style="background:#fcf;"
| 35 || Dec 23 || Pittsburgh Penguins || 2–5 || Detroit Red Wings || Olympia Stadium || 14–16–5 || 33
|- style="background:#cfc;"
| 36 || Dec 26 || Toronto Maple Leafs || 2–4 || Pittsburgh Penguins || Civic Arena || 15–16–5 || 35
|- style="background:#ffc;"
| 37 || Dec 29 || Montreal Canadiens || 3–3 || Pittsburgh Penguins || Civic Arena || 15–16–6 || 36
|-

|- style="background:#cfc;"
| 38 || Jan 1 || Buffalo Sabres || 3–6 || Pittsburgh Penguins || Civic Arena || 16–16–6 || 38
|- style="background:#ffc;"
| 39 || Jan 4 || Vancouver Canucks || 2–2 || Pittsburgh Penguins || Civic Arena || 16–16–7 || 39
|- style="background:#ffc;"
| 40 || Jan 6 || Pittsburgh Penguins || 3–3 || Washington Capitals || Capital Centre || 16–16–8 || 40
|- style="background:#cfc;"
| 41 || Jan 8 || Chicago Black Hawks || 2–4 || Pittsburgh Penguins || Civic Arena || 17–16–8 || 42
|- style="background:#fcf;"
| 42 || Jan 11 || Toronto Maple Leafs || 2–0 || Pittsburgh Penguins || Civic Arena || 17–17–8 || 42
|- style="background:#cfc;"
| 43 || Jan 15 || Buffalo Sabres || 2–5 || Pittsburgh Penguins || Civic Arena || 18–17–8 || 44
|- style="background:#fcf;"
| 44 || Jan 16 || Atlanta Flames || 6–5 || Pittsburgh Penguins || Civic Arena || 18–18–8 || 44
|- style="background:#cfc;"
| 45 || Jan 19 || Pittsburgh Penguins || 3–0 || Vancouver Canucks || Pacific Coliseum || 19–18–8 || 46
|- style="background:#fcf;"
| 46 || Jan 20 || Pittsburgh Penguins || 3–5 || Los Angeles Kings || The Forum || 19–19–8 || 46
|- style="background:#cfc;"
| 47 || Jan 22 || New York Islanders || 2–3 || Pittsburgh Penguins || Civic Arena || 20–19–8 || 48
|- style="background:#cfc;"
| 48 || Jan 27 || Pittsburgh Penguins || 3–0 || New York Rangers || Madison Square Garden (IV) || 21–19–8 || 50
|- style="background:#fcf;"
| 49 || Jan 29 || Philadelphia Flyers || 5–2 || Pittsburgh Penguins || Civic Arena || 21–20–8 || 50
|- style="background:#cfc;"
| 50 || Jan 30 || Boston Bruins || 2–5 || Pittsburgh Penguins || Civic Arena || 22–20–8 || 52
|-

|- style="background:#cfc;"
| 51 || Feb 2 || Minnesota North Stars || 2–5 || Pittsburgh Penguins || Civic Arena || 23–20–8 || 54
|- style="background:#ffc;"
| 52 || Feb 3 || Pittsburgh Penguins || 0–0 || Cleveland Barons || Coliseum at Richfield || 23–20–9 || 55
|- style="background:#cfc;"
| 53 || Feb 5 || Detroit Red Wings || 1–3 || Pittsburgh Penguins || Civic Arena || 24–20–9 || 57
|- style="background:#fcf;"
| 54 || Feb 6 || Pittsburgh Penguins || 2–5 || Colorado Rockies || McNichols Sports Arena || 24–21–9 || 57
|- style="background:#fcf;"
| 55 || Feb 8 || Pittsburgh Penguins || 3–6 || St. Louis Blues || St. Louis Arena || 24–22–9 || 57
|- style="background:#fcf;"
| 56 || Feb 11 || Pittsburgh Penguins || 2–3 || Vancouver Canucks || Pacific Coliseum || 24–23–9 || 57
|- style="background:#cfc;"
| 57 || Feb 12 || Pittsburgh Penguins || 3–2 || Los Angeles Kings || The Forum || 25–23–9 || 59
|- style="background:#ffc;"
| 58 || Feb 16 || Montreal Canadiens || 4–4 || Pittsburgh Penguins || Civic Arena || 25–23–10 || 60
|- style="background:#ffc;"
| 59 || Feb 19 || Pittsburgh Penguins || 6–6 || Toronto Maple Leafs || Maple Leaf Gardens || 25–23–11 || 61
|- style="background:#cfc;"
| 60 || Feb 20 || Cleveland Barons || 1–4 || Pittsburgh Penguins || Civic Arena || 26–23–11 || 63
|- style="background:#fcf;"
| 61 || Feb 22 || Pittsburgh Penguins || 1–3 || Washington Capitals || Capital Centre || 26–24–11 || 63
|- style="background:#fcf;"
| 62 || Feb 24 || Pittsburgh Penguins || 2–3 || Detroit Red Wings || Olympia Stadium || 26–25–11 || 63
|- style="background:#cfc;"
| 63 || Feb 26 || Washington Capitals || 1–2 || Pittsburgh Penguins || Civic Arena || 27–25–11 || 65
|- style="background:#ffc;"
| 64 || Feb 27 || Boston Bruins || 2–2 || Pittsburgh Penguins || Civic Arena || 27–25–12 || 66
|-

|- style="background:#fcf;"
| 65 || Mar 2 || Los Angeles Kings || 5–0 || Pittsburgh Penguins || Civic Arena || 27–26–12 || 66
|- style="background:#fcf;"
| 66 || Mar 3 || Pittsburgh Penguins || 1–5 || Montreal Canadiens || Montreal Forum || 27–27–12 || 66
|- style="background:#ffc;"
| 67 || Mar 5 || Pittsburgh Penguins || 3–3 || Los Angeles Kings || The Forum || 27–27–13 || 67
|- style="background:#cfc;"
| 68 || Mar 8 || Pittsburgh Penguins || 2–1 || St. Louis Blues || St. Louis Arena || 28–27–13 || 69
|- style="background:#cfc;"
| 69 || Mar 9 || Colorado Rockies || 0–3 || Pittsburgh Penguins || Civic Arena || 29–27–13 || 71
|- style="background:#cfc;"
| 70 || Mar 12 || Buffalo Sabres || 2–3 || Pittsburgh Penguins || Civic Arena || 30–27–13 || 73
|- style="background:#fcf;"
| 71 || Mar 13 || Pittsburgh Penguins || 0–4 || Philadelphia Flyers || The Spectrum || 30–28–13 || 73
|- style="background:#fcf;"
| 72 || Mar 15 || Pittsburgh Penguins || 3–7 || Atlanta Flames || Omni Coliseum || 30–29–13 || 73
|- style="background:#cfc;"
| 73 || Mar 16 || St. Louis Blues || 3–7 || Pittsburgh Penguins || Civic Arena || 31–29–13 || 75
|- style="background:#fcf;"
| 74 || Mar 19 || New York Rangers || 5–2 || Pittsburgh Penguins || Civic Arena || 31–30–13 || 75
|- style="background:#fcf;"
| 75 || Mar 20 || Pittsburgh Penguins || 2–3 || Chicago Black Hawks || Chicago Stadium || 31–31–13 || 75
|- style="background:#cfc;"
| 76 || Mar 22 || Pittsburgh Penguins || 4–2 || Minnesota North Stars || Met Center || 32–31–13 || 77
|- style="background:#fcf;"
| 77 || Mar 27 || Pittsburgh Penguins || 0–3 || Boston Bruins || Boston Garden || 32–32–13 || 77
|- style="background:#fcf;"
| 78 || Mar 30 || Washington Capitals || 4–3 || Pittsburgh Penguins || Civic Arena || 32–33–13 || 77
|-

|- style="background:#cfc;"
| 79 || Apr 2 || Pittsburgh Penguins || 4–3 || Detroit Red Wings || Olympia Stadium || 33–33–13 || 79
|- style="background:#cfc;"
| 80 || Apr 3 || Detroit Red Wings || 2–4 || Pittsburgh Penguins || Civic Arena || 34–33–13 || 81
|-

|- style="text-align:center;"
| Legend:       = Win       = Loss       = Tie

Playoffs
The Penguins' opponent in the first round of the Stanley Cup playoffs was once again the Toronto Maple Leafs. While the Penguins' offensive output greatly improved to ten goals scored (compared to 1976's three goals), the Maple Leafs once again dispatched the Penguins in three games.

Player statistics
Skaters

Goaltenders

†Denotes player spent time with another team before joining the Penguins.  Stats reflect time with the Penguins only.
‡Denotes player was traded mid-season.  Stats reflect time with the Penguins only.

Awards and records
 Jean Pronovost became the first player to score 500 points for the Penguins. He did so in a 3–6 loss to New York on December 11th.

Transactions
The Penguins were involved in the following transactions during the 1976–77 season:

Trades

Additions and subtractions

†Colin Campbell was loaned to the Rockies for one season. He was returned to the Penguins in 1977.

Draft picks 

The 1976 NHL Amateur Draft was held on June 1, 1976 in Montreal, Quebec.

References
 Penguins on Hockey Database

Pittsburgh Penguins seasons
Pittsburgh
Pittsburgh
Pitts
Pitts